Willy Brokamp (born 25 February 1946) is a former football player for MVV Maastricht in the 1960s and 1970s who recruited him from RKVV Chèvremont (in the community of Kerkrade). His nickname was "The blond arrow".

He ranked highly in the Footballer of the Year classification for several times. In 1973, he shared the first place on the list of top scorers with 18 goals together with Cas Janssens.

Club career
In 1974, he transferred to Ajax Amsterdam, where he himself had two very good seasons (1974/75, 1975/76).

International career
He also played six games for the Dutch national team and scored six goals.

Personal life
Brokamp was not only a footballer. During his football career he started his own bar. For many years he was manager of the bar "Aux Pays-Bas" next to the Vrijthof and several other establishments in Maastricht.

He currently lives in Kanne, Belgium near Maastricht. Since 1999, he also owns a bar there, named In Kanne en Kruike.

Honours
MVV
 UEFA Intertoto Cup: 1970

References

External links
 

1946 births
Living people
Sportspeople from Kerkrade
Association football forwards
Dutch footballers
Netherlands international footballers
MVV Maastricht players
AFC Ajax players
Eredivisie players
Eerste Divisie players
Footballers from Limburg (Netherlands)